Buzançais (or ) is a commune and town in the French department of Indre, administrative region of Centre-Val de Loire.

The Indre river flows through the commune.

Population

The inhabitants are known as Buzancéens and Buzancéennes.

Notable people
 Pascal Maitre, contemporary photographer.
 Albert Laprade, architect.
 Michel Denisot, journalist, producer and TV host.

See also
Communes of Indre

References

External links

Brenne regional nature preserve

Communes of Indre
Berry, France